{{Infobox magazine
| image_file    = Womenspostcover.jpg
| image_size    = 125px
| image_caption = Women's Post, April/May 2010
| editor        = Sarah Lambert
| editor_title  = 
| frequency     = Intermittently
| category      = General Interest, Business, Lifestyle
| company       = Independent
| publisher     = Sarah Thomson
| firstdate     = January 2002 (as a newspaper)  2008 (as a magazine)
| finaldate = November 2019
| country       = Canada
| based         = Toronto
| language      = English
| website       = 
| issn          = 
}}

The Women's Post was a Canadian  English-language magazine, targeted at professional business women, based in Toronto and distributed nationally. The magazine was published every other month, had a circulation of 75,000 with a community of 300,000 in both print and online in 2010."Lone woman runs in race for mayor's chair", Toronto Star, 13 March 2010

History and profile
It was founded as the Women's News, a monthly tabloid format newspaper, in 2002 by Greg and Sarah Thomson and was renamed the Women's Post in 2003. In 2008, it relaunched in a glossy news magazine format which was published weekly. The first issue of the magazine was published on 1 August 2008. In 2009, the magazine's print schedule moved to six times a year with its online version moving from monthly to weekly publication. Since 2010, however, the print version has only been published quarterly. 

Thomson moved to Barbados in 2018 to begin and run an ecotourism business.

The magazine's website was last updated in November 2019.

Contributors
The Women's Post'' regular contributors included Michael Coren, Kirk Lapointe and Russell Wangersky.

References

External links
Women's Post

2002 establishments in Ontario
2008 establishments in Ontario
Bi-monthly magazines published in Canada
Online magazines published in Canada
Quarterly magazines published in Canada
News magazines published in Canada
Women's magazines published in Canada
Magazines established in 2008
Magazines published in Toronto
Publications established in 2002
Weekly magazines published in Canada
Magazines disestablished in 2019
Online magazines with defunct print editions
Defunct magazines published in Canada